Benin competed at the 2004 Summer Paralympics in Athens, Greece.   Their delegation included two sportspeople, neither of whom medaled.

Sports 
The team included two athletes, one man and one woman, neither of whom won a medal. Benin was one of a number of nations with a small delegation competing in Athens. One of the country's representatives was powerlifter Akouavi Bladine Sahenou.  The other was athlete Loukmane Nassirou.  He had an acquired vision impairment, and was a member of the athletics club, Almighty Wheelchair: Benin.  Neither earned a medal.

Athletics

Powerlifting

See also
Benin at the Paralympics
Benin at the 2004 Summer Olympics

References 

Nations at the 2004 Summer Paralympics
2004
Summer Paralympics